Planica 1947 was a ski flying week, allowed only in study purposes, competition held on 24 March 1947 in Planica, PR Slovenia, FPR Yugoslavia. This was the first post WWII competition with total over 25,000 people.

Schedule

Competition
On 17 March 1947, the first training of ski flying study week was on schedule at 11 AM with three rounds. The longest distance was set by Rudi Finžgar at 94 metres.

On 18 March 1947, the second training of ski flying study week was on schedule with four rounds at the 10 AM morning event and four rounds at the 15:15 PM afternoon event. Both times Rudi Finžgar was the longest with 91 and 109 metres.

On 19 March 1947, training of ski flying study week was on schedule. But it was canceled, no jumps at large hill that day due to heavy rain in the morning. Hill was useless. They all moved to near Hotel Ilirija where Finžgar was telling stories.

On 20 March 1947, the third training day of ski flying study week was on schedule. Morning event was canceled due to wet snow, late afternoon event was ready at 16 PM with thirteen jumps. The longest was Fritz Tschannen at 90 metres.

On 21 March 1947, the fourth training of ski flying study week was on schedule in three rounds. It started at 10 AM with the longest jump of Janko Mežik at 95 metres. Today were totally different weather conditions than yesterday, sunny and frozen snow.

On 22 March 1947, the last training of ski flying study week was on schedule in two rounds. With more visitors each Rudi Finžgar was the longest again with 102 metres. Today was the day with full preparations for tomorrow's main competition.

On 23 March 1947, the main competition was on scheduled, but canceled due to heavy rain. 15,000 disappointed and angry people that gathered around the hill had to go home. Competition was rescheduled on Monday, at the next day.

On 24 March 1947, rescheduled competition from Sunday, this time a lot smaller crowd was held. Hill was ready at 9 AM and Rudi Finžgar who the competition in a battle for the best jump of the day.

Training 1
11:00 AM — 17 March 1947 — Three rounds — chronological order

Training 2
10:00 AM — 18 March 1947 — Four rounds — chronological order

Training 3
16:00 AM — 20 March 1947 — One round — chronological order

Training 4
10:00 AM — 21 March 1947 — Three rounds — chronological order

Training 5
8:30 AM — 22 March 1947 — Two rounds — chronological order

 Yugoslavian national record! Fall or touch!

Official results

Ski Flying Study competition
24 March 1947 — 9:00 AM — Two rounds — ranking incomplete — points N/A

References

1947 in Yugoslav sport
1947 in ski jumping
1947 in Slovenia
Ski jumping competitions in Yugoslavia
International sports competitions hosted by Yugoslavia
Ski jumping competitions in Slovenia
International sports competitions hosted by Slovenia